Set the Twilight Reeling is the seventeenth studio album by American rock musician Lou Reed, released on February 20, 1996 by Warner Bros. Records.

Packaging and lyrics
The cover artwork direction and packaging design was done by Stefan Sagmeister. The photograph is by Timothy Greenfield-Sanders. The CD case sold with the album was a dark purple/blue hue, making the cover look like a dark blue picture of Reed's face; the bright yellow aspect and the "rays" of the cover image were only made apparent when the liner notes were removed from its case.

As noted on the lyric sheet, "Finish Line" was Reed's tribute to the Velvet Underground's guitarist Sterling Morrison, who had died the previous year. The album is dedicated to Laurie Anderson, whom Reed would marry twelve years after its release. David Fricke of Rolling Stone wrote that Laurie Anderson was the love interest in the track "Hooky Wooky", in which Reed writes of his jealousy over his paramour's ex-lovers.

Reception

Set the Twilight Reeling received generally positive reviews from critics.

Track listing
All tracks written by Lou Reed.

"Egg Cream" – 5:18
"NYC Man" – 4:56
"Finish Line" – 3:24
"Trade In" – 4:59
"Hang On to Your Emotions" – 3:46
"Sex with Your Parents (Motherfucker), Part II" – 3:37
"HookyWooky" – 4:19
"The Proposition" – 3:27
"Adventurer" – 4:18
"Riptide" – 7:46
"Set the Twilight Reeling" – 5:04

"Sex with Your Parents (Motherfucker)" recorded live on July 14, 1995 at The Roof, New York City

Personnel
Credits are adapted from the Set the Twilight Reeling liner notes.
Lou Reed – vocals, guitar
Fernando Saunders – bass guitar, acoustic guitar on "NYC Man", backing vocals
Tony "Thunder" Smith – drums, backing vocals
Oliver Lake, J. D. Parran, Russell Gunn – horns on "NYC Man"
Roy Bittan – piano on "Finish Line"
Mino Cinelu – percussion on "Finish Line"
Laurie Anderson – backing vocals on "Hang On to Your Emotions"
Technical
Struan Oglanby – programming, production co-ordination
Bob Ludwig - mastering

References

External links

Lou Reed albums
1996 albums
Albums produced by Lou Reed
Albums with cover art by Stefan Sagmeister
Sire Records albums